The Louisiana IceGators were a professional ice hockey team in the Southern Professional Hockey League that began play in the 2009–10 season. Like the original IceGators, which played from 1995 until folding in 2005, they were based in Lafayette, Louisiana. The IceGators were brought back by local businessman Danny Smith. In August 2010, Smith sold the team to two local businessmen, E.C. "Chuck" Anselmo, Jr. and E.C. "Chuck" Anselmo, III.

History
For their first season as members of the SPHL, home games were played at the Blackham Coliseum rather than the Cajundome, the original home of the ECHL's IceGators. For the 2010–11 season, the team's home ice returned to the Cajundome, also called the "Frozen Swamp."

On October 26, 2009, Ron Handy stepped down as head coach after a 0-3-0 start. He was replaced by general manager Brent Sapergia on an interim basis.  Sapergia was banned by the league after being disqualified from two games in a row.  In Pensacola, Sapergia threw a water bottle onto the ice, then a water cooler, then a pair of medical kits.  Sapergia finished the tirade by emptying Louisiana's supply of hockey sticks into play and giving a farewell gesture to the fans as he left the arena. Former Huntsville Havoc player and coach John Gibson was later named head coach, while Handy began to focus on community relations and off-ice operations. Gibson would coach 11 games before being replaced by Dave MacIsaac. MacIsaac would finish off the 2009–10 season, coaching 38 games, finishing with a record of 18-18-0.

On October 18, 2010, the IceGators affiliated with the New York Islanders of the National Hockey League for the 2010–11 season. During the 2010–11 season, MacIsaac would have 7 wins and 14 losses in 22 games before being let go. He was replaced in December 2010 by former NHL enforcer Kevin "Killer" Kaminiski. Also during this season, the IceGators brought back forward Shawn McNeil who had played for the ECHL IceGators from 1999 to 2003. The IceGators also started rookie goalie Scott Darling who would become the first SPHL player to play in the National Hockey League when he was called up by the Chicago Blackhawks during the 2014–15 NHL season. The Blackhawks won the Stanley Cup with Darling as a back-up to Corey Crawford.

In 2013–14, IceGators star player, Shawn McNeil, would play in 56 games achieving 18 goals and 49 assists at the age of 35. On April 3, 2014, Shawn was named the 2013–14 Easton SPHL Most Valuable Player. "McNeil led all players in points (67) and assists (49) and tied SPHL season-highs with an 18-game point streak and an eight-game assist streak.  One of four IceGators to play all 56 games, McNeil was a team-best +18 as he led Louisiana to a second-place finish in the regular season."

On May 16, 2016, the IceGators' general manager and the SPHL announced that the team is suspending operations for the 2016–17 SPHL season due to planned Cajundome renovations. However, sometime after the announcement, the team shut down its headquarters, the website was taken down, and the team has not indicated a return. In 2018, the franchise was sold and became the Quad City Storm.

Team record

Season-by-season records
As of the 2015–16 season

Attendance

Team information

Captains
2009–10: Paul McBrien
2010–15: Shawn McNeil
2015–16: Jake Hauswirth/Mike Kavanagh

Coaching history
2009: Ron Handy (0-3-0)
2009: Brent Sapergia (2-2-0)
2009: John Gibson (3-8-0)
2009–11: David MacIsaac (25-33-2)
2011: Chris Valicevic (0-3-0)
2011–14: Kevin Kaminski (102-84-13)
2014–16: Drew Omicioli (27-21-8)

General Manager
 2009–10: Brent Sapergia 
 2010–11: Dave Berryman 
 2011–present: Louis Dumont

SPHL awards

2010–11
Beau McLaughlin: All-SPHL Second Team

2011–12
Brayden Metz: All-SPHL Rookie Team
Jason Hill: All-SPHL Second Team

2012–13
Riley Gill: SPHL Goalie of the Year Award Winner, All-SPHL First Team
Matt Robertson: All-SPHL First Team
Kirk Byczynski: All-SPHL Second Team, All-SPHL Rookie Team

2013–14
Shawn McNeil: Easton Most Valuable Player, All-SPHL First Team
Kirk Byczynski: All-SPHL Second Team

2015–16
Jake Hauswirth: All-SPHL Second Team
Zac Frischmon: All-SPHL Rookie Team

References

External links
Official Website

 
Southern Professional Hockey League teams
Sports teams in Lafayette, Louisiana
Ice hockey teams in Louisiana
Ice hockey clubs established in 2009
2009 establishments in Louisiana